Jazz Bilzen was an annual multi-day open air jazz and pop festival that took place from 1965 to 1981 in the Belgian city of Bilzen. Jazz Bilzen was the first festival on the continent where jazz and pop music were brought together. For this reason, Jazz Bilzen is sometimes called the "mother of all European festivals".

History
Like the National Jazz and Blues Festival in the United Kingdom, and the Jazz Festival International in Comblain-la-Tour, which were paradigms, Bilzen started out solely as a jazz festival. Pretty soon however blues, skiffle, beat, folk and soul, in the end even punk, reggae and new wave, came to be incorporated as well. Initially Humo, a popular Belgian weekly magazine, was the main sponsor. After several years, they withdrew because they got fed up with the security branch and the riots they caused. The Festival organisation now had to find different investors (such as Coca-Cola, Ford, provincial newspapers), which was indicative of the beginning of the end. From the 1980s onwards, the festival was superseded by Torhout-Werchter, which has now become Rock Werchter.

Lineups
A few of the pop/rock artists that performed at the festival included:
AC/DC,
Aerosmith,
Al Stewart,
Alberto y Lost Trios Paranoias,
Alvin Lee,
America,
Armand,
Badfinger,
Barclay James Harvest,
Beggars Opera,
Black Oak Arkansas,
Black Sabbath,
Blondie,
Blossom Toes,
Blues Dimension, 
Bonzo Dog Doo Dah Band,
Boudewijn de Groot,
Bram Tchaikovsky, 
Burnin' Plague, 
Camel,
Cat Stevens,
CCC Inc.,
Climax Blues Band,
Colin Blunstone,
Cos,
Cuby + Blizzards,
Curved Air,
Deep Purple,
De Dream, 
Dexys Midnight Runners,
Eire Apparent,
Ekseption,
Elvis Costello,
Faces,
Fairport Convention,
Frankie Miller,
Focus,
Ginger Baker,
Girlschool,
Golden Earring,
Greenslade,
Group 1850,
Herman Brood,
Humble Pie,
Ian Gillan Band,
Ian Hunter,
Inner Circle,
Jan Akkerman,
Jango Edwards,
Japan,
Jeff Beck,
John Cale,
John Miles,
JSD Band,
Kandahar,
Kevin Ayers,
Kevin Coyne,
Lindisfarne,
Long Tall Ernie & the Shakers,
Lou Reed,
Machiavel,
Magma,
Man,
Marsha Hunt,
MC5,
Medicine Head,
Michael Chapman,
Mott the Hoople,
Mungo Jerry,
Nils Lofgren,
Partner,
Procol Harum,
Ramones,
Rare Bird,
Raymond van het Groenewoud,
Rick Wakeman,
Rory Gallagher,
Sandy Denny,
Screaming Lord Sutch,
Shocking Blue,
Slade, 
Small Faces,
Soft Machine,
Spencer Davis Group,
Status Quo,
Steeleye Span,
Stiff Little Fingers,
Stray,
Supercharge,
Supersister,
 Sutherland Brothers & Quiver,
Taste,
TC Matic, 
T. Rex,
Ted Nugent,
The Blue Diamonds,
The Clash,
The Cure,
The Damned,
The Guess Who,
The Holy Modal Rounders,
The Idle Race,
The Jam,
The Kids,
The Kinks,
The Moody Blues,
The Move,
The Pebbles,
The Police,
The Pretty Things,
The Ro-D-Ys,
The Sensational Alex Harvey Band,
The Troggs,
Thin Lizzy,
Third World War,
Uriah Heep,
Van Morrison,
Wishbone Ash,
Whitesnake,
Wizzard,
and Zen.

Some of the jazz/blues/folk/soul and other greats who made their appearances, were:
Alan Stivell,
Alexis Korner,
Archie Shepp,
Arthur Conley,
Brian Auger,
Brownie McGhee,
Cecil Taylor,
Champion Jack Dupree,
Charles Lloyd,
Charles Mingus,
Chick Corea,
Clark Terry,
Dan Ar Braz,
Dexter Gordon,
Dizzy Gillespie,
Dutch Swing College Band,
Eddie Boyd,
Elvin Jones,
Franco Manzecchi,
Freddie Hubbard,
Gato Barbieri,
Han Bennink,
Herman van Veen,
Ike & Tina Turner,
Isotope,
James Brown,
Jan Hammer,
Jean-Luc Ponty,
Joe Henderson,
John McLaughlin,
Keith Jarrett,
Klaus Doldinger,
Larry Coryell,
Mahavishnu Orchestra,
Marc Moulin,
Memphis Slim,
Nucleus,
Ornette Coleman,
Paco de Lucia,
Passport,
Peter Brötzmann,
Pharoah Sanders Quartet,
Philip Catherine,
Pim Jacobs,
Ralph McTell,
Reverend Gary Davis,
Rita Reys,
Romanesj Gypsy Orchestra,
Slide Hampton,
Sonny Rollins,
Sonny Terry,
Stanley Clarke,
Steve Shorter,
Toots Thielemans,
Wannes Van de Velde, 
Weather Report,
Will Tura,
Willem Vermandere,
Yusef Lateef,
and Zoot Sims.

Notable non-appearances amongst invited artists included:
Badger,
ELO,
Elton John,
Frank Zappa,
Jack Bruce,
Jo Lemaire, 
Mimi Fariña, 
Pentangle,
Pink Floyd,
Ramones,
The Nice,
and Yes.

Festival by year

See also
 List of jazz festivals
 List of historic rock festivals

References

External links

 Brian Auger & Trinity (Live at Jazz Bilzen 1969) HD
 Deep Purple – Mandrake Root (Live in Bilzen 1969) HD

Bilzen
Counterculture festivals
Jazz festivals in Belgium
Music festivals established in 1965